Dicranocephalus is the sole genus of true bugs in the family Stenocephalidae. There are about 30 described species in Dicranocephalus.

Species
These 30 species belong to the genus Dicranocephalus:

 Dicranocephalus agilis (Scopoli, 1763)
 Dicranocephalus albipes (Fabricius, 1781)
 Dicranocephalus alticolus (Zheng, 1981)
 Dicranocephalus aroonanus Brailovsky, Barrera, Göllner-Scheiding & Cassis, 2001
 Dicranocephalus brevinotum (Lindberg, 1935)
 Dicranocephalus caffer (Dallas, 1852)
 Dicranocephalus femoralis (Reuter, 1888)
 Dicranocephalus ferganensis (Horváth, 1887)
 Dicranocephalus ganziensis Ren, 1990
 Dicranocephalus haoussa (Villiers, 1950)
 Dicranocephalus hirsutus Moulet, 1993
 Dicranocephalus insularis (Dallas, 1852)
 Dicranocephalus kashmiriensis Lansbury, 1966
 Dicranocephalus lateralis (Signoret, 1879)
 Dicranocephalus lautipes (Stål, 1860)
 Dicranocephalus marginatus (Ferrari, 1874)
 Dicranocephalus marginicollis (Puton, 1881)
 Dicranocephalus medius (Mulsant & Rey, 1870)
 Dicranocephalus mucronifer (Stål, 1860)
 Dicranocephalus pallidus (Signoret, 1879)
 Dicranocephalus panelii Lindberg, 1959
 Dicranocephalus pilosus (Bergroth, 1912)
 Dicranocephalus prolixus Lansbury, 1965
 Dicranocephalus pseudotestaceus Lansbury, 1966
 Dicranocephalus punctarius (Stål, 1866)
 Dicranocephalus punctipes (Stål, 1873)
 Dicranocephalus putoni (Horváth, 1897)
 Dicranocephalus schmitzi Göllner-Scheiding, 1996
 Dicranocephalus setulosus (Ferrari, 1874)
 Dicranocephalus testaceus (Stål, 1860)

Bibliography

 R. T. Schuh, J. A. Slater: True Bugs of the World (Hemiptera: Heteroptera). Classification and Natural History. Cornell University Press, Ithaca, New York 1995.

References

External links

Coreoidea
Pentatomomorpha genera